Yang Hao (born 21 March 1980 in Dalian, Liaoning) is a retired Chinese female volleyball player.

She was a member of the Chinese team that won the gold medal at the 2004 Athens Olympic Games and bronze at the 2008 Beijing Olympic Games.

Clubs
  Liaoning (1994–2000)
  Shanghai (2000–2001)
  Liaoning (2001–2008)
  Pallavolo Sirio Perugia (2008–2009)
  Guangdong Evergrande (2009–2010)

Awards

Individuals
 2001 FIVB World Grand Champions Cup "Most Valuable Player"
 2001 FIVB World Grand Champions Cup "Best Spiker"
 2001 FIVB World Grand Champions Cup "Best Server"
 2002 FIVB World Grand Prix "Best Scorer"
 2002 FIVB World Grand Prix "Best Spiker"
 2002 FIVB World Grand Prix "Best Server"
 2003 Asian Championship "Most Valuable Player"
 2003 Asian Championship "Best Scorer"
 2003 Asian Championship "Best Server"
 2003 FIVB World Grand Prix "Best Spiker"
 2003 FIVB World Grand Prix "Best Server"
 2003-2004 Chinese Volleyball League "Most Valuable Player"
 2005 FIVB World Grand Prix "Best Spiker"
 2005 FIVB World Grand Prix "Best Server"
 2005 Montreux Volley Masters "Best Scorer"
 2005 Montreux Volley Masters "Best Server"
 2005-2006 Chinese Volleyball League "Most Valuable Player"
 2007 FIVB World Grand Prix "Best Server"

Clubs
 2000–01 Chinese League -  Champion, with Shanghai
 2005–06 Chinese League -  Champion, with Liaoning

References

1980 births
Living people
Volleyball players from Dalian
Olympic bronze medalists for China
Olympic gold medalists for China
Olympic volleyball players of China
Volleyball players at the 2004 Summer Olympics
Volleyball players at the 2008 Summer Olympics
Olympic medalists in volleyball
Medalists at the 2008 Summer Olympics
Medalists at the 2004 Summer Olympics
Asian Games medalists in volleyball
Volleyball players at the 2002 Asian Games
Volleyball players at the 2006 Asian Games
Chinese women's volleyball players
Asian Games gold medalists for China
Medalists at the 2002 Asian Games
Medalists at the 2006 Asian Games
Wing spikers
Chinese expatriate sportspeople
Chinese expatriates in Italy
Expatriate volleyball players in Italy
21st-century Chinese women